Our Man in Nashville is the twentieth studio album by American guitarist Chet Atkins, released in 1963. RCA did a series of "Our Man in ..." and Chet was indeed their man in Nashville. He was producing and developing the "Nashville sound".

The album is primarily notable for featuring Atkins's first recordings of instrumentals composed by Jerry Reed. During the next thirty-two years Reed provided Atkins with more than thirty original guitar compositions.

Our Man in Nashville is out of print.

Reception

Writing for Allmusic, critic Richard S. Ginell wrote of the album "Chester remains his usual unclassifiable self, dealing out the country picking, smooth easy listening guitar, jazz, and even some very mild rock & roll on this session, with some overdubbed strings discreetly decorating a few tracks... And, as on so many Atkins albums, there is at least one track that one can develop a guilty addiction to for no particular reason; here, it's the happy-go-lucky "Always on Saturday.""

Track listing

Side one
 "Scare Crow" (Jerry Reed) – 2:19
 "Alexander's Ragtime Band" (Irving Berlin)
 "Melissa" (Tupper Saussy) – 2:16
 "Goodnight Irene" (Lead Belly, Alan Lomax) – 2:41
 "Old Double Shuffle" (John D. Loudermilk) – 2:58
 "Down Home" (Jerry Reed) – 2:03

Side two
 "Always on Saturday" (Cy Coben) – 2:10
 "Drown in My Own Tears" (Henry Glover) – 2:14
 "Spanish Harlem" (Jerry Leiber, Phil Spector) – 2:53
 "Streamlined Cannonball" (Roy Acuff) – 2:35
 "House in New Orleans" (Traditional; arranged by Chet Atkins) – 2:13
 "A Little Bitty Tear" (Hank Cochran) – 2:31

Personnel
Chet Atkins – guitar

References

1963 albums
Chet Atkins albums
Albums produced by Anita Kerr
RCA Victor albums